is a national women's university located in Nara, Nara Prefecture, Japan. It is one of two national women's universities in the country, the other being Ochanomizu University.

History
Nara Women's University was originally created in 1908 with the aim of training women teachers for ordinary schools, later to be reorganized and renamed with its current name in 1949. Until 1949 there were only two women's imperial quasi-universities in Japan, the Ochanomizu University and Nara Women's University.

Nara Women's University was formerly called  .

Faculties 
As of 2013, the university has three faculties:
 the Faculty of Letters
 the Faculty of Science
 the Faculty of Human Life and Environment

Graduate school 
As of 2013, the university has two graduate programs:
 Master's Course of Humanities and Sciences
 Doctoral Course of Humanities and Sciences

Buildings 
The following buildings on the university's campus are designated Important Cultural Properties:
   
 the Memorial Hall (formerly the main hall)
 the Main Gate

See also
 Global Classroom Conference, hosted by the University in 2000

References

External links 

Nara Women's University

 
Japanese national universities
Universities and colleges in Nara Prefecture
Women's universities and colleges in Japan
Important Cultural Properties of Japan